Santiago Ignacio Bueno Sciutto (born 9 November 1998) is an Uruguayan professional footballer who plays as a central defender for La Liga club Girona FC.

Club career

Peñarol
Born in Montevideo, Bueno joined Peñarol in 2009, aged ten. On 5 January 2016, he was promoted to the first team squad.

Bueno made his unofficial first team debut on 23 January 2016, playing the entire second-half of a 1–1 draw against Club Libertad in the Copa Antel friendly tournament.

Barcelona
On 31 January 2017, FC Barcelona reached an agreement with Peñarol for the transfer of Bueno. He signed a two-and-a-half-year contract with the Catalans. Barcelona had followed his progress for a year before signing him.

Peralada (loans)
On 24 January 2018, Bueno was loaned to Segunda División B side CF Peralada-Girona B until the end of the season.

He returned to Peralada-Girona B on 31 August 2018 for a second loan spell.

Girona
On 19 August 2019, Bueno signed a five-year contract with Girona FC in the second division, as a free agent. He made his debut for the club on 19 December, starting in a 2–1 away win against Linares Deportivo in that season's Copa del Rey.

Bueno made his professional debut on 20 July 2020, coming on as a late substitute for Christian Rivera in a 2–0 loss at AD Alcorcón in the Segunda División championship.

International career
Bueno has represented Uruguay at under-17 and under-20 youth international levels. In December 2019, he was called up to the under-23 team for the 2020 CONMEBOL Pre-Olympic Tournament.

On 21 October 2022, Bueno was named in Uruguay's 55-man preliminary squad for the 2022 FIFA World Cup.

Personal life
Bueno is the younger brother of professional footballer Gastón Bueno. His cousin Gonzalo Bueno is a former Uruguayan youth international.

Honours
Uruguay U20
 South American Youth Football Championship: 2017

References

External links

1998 births
Living people
Uruguayan footballers
Association football central defenders
Uruguay youth international footballers
Uruguay under-20 international footballers
Segunda División players
Segunda División B players
Peñarol players
FC Barcelona players
CF Peralada players
Girona FC players
Uruguayan expatriate footballers
Uruguayan expatriates in Spain
Expatriate footballers in Spain